Mini Pampa is a major halting stations for pilgrims from north Kerala, Tamil Nadu and Karnataka and has been declared an official transit point of Sabarimala. The premises of the Mallur Siva Temple near Kuttippuram bridge, known as ‘Mini Pampa,' have been increasingly attracting tourists. It is located on the banks of Bharathappuzha.

Image Gallery

References 

Hindu pilgrimage sites in India